Empire City is an unincorporated community in Cherokee County, Kansas, United States, and located at .

History
Empire City once had a post office; it was discontinued in 1913.

References

Further reading

External links
 Cherokee County maps: Current, Historic, KDOT

Unincorporated communities in Cherokee County, Kansas
Unincorporated communities in Kansas